The Miraculous Journey (2005 to 2013) is a series of 14 bronze sculptures by the artist Damien Hirst. The sculptures are situated outside the Sidra Medicine in Doha, Qatar. The sculptures show the development of a human foetus in the womb, ending with a 46ft tall sculpture of a baby boy. Hirst said that his fascination with childbirth began after the birth of his own children, saying that "Everyone talks about our life's journey, but we have a whole journey before you're born".

The work was originally unveiled in 2013, but was covered up until November 2018. At its 2013 unveiling each sculpture was covered with a balloon that slowly opened to reveal each piece.

The sculptures vary from 5 to 11 meters in height and collectively weigh 216 tonnes. The piece is believed to have cost $20 million.

The Qatari Sheikah Al-Mayassa bint Hamad bin Khalifa Al-Thani visited Hirst's studio in Gloucestershire, England, and was shown drawings from 2005 that Hirst had made of prenatal development. Hirst had intended them to be monumental sculptures, and Sheikha al Mayassa imagined situating them in front of the Sidra Medical Center.

References

2013 sculptures
Public art in Qatar
Pregnancy in art
Works by Damien Hirst